Odysseas Angelis (2 January 1912 – 22 March 1987) was a Greek military officer, who served as head of the Greek military during the Greek military junta of 1967–1974, and was selected by junta principal Georgios Papadopoulos as Vice President of the junta-proclaimed republic in 1973. He was deposed along with Papadopoulos by junta hardliners in November 1973, and sentenced to 20 years imprisonment for high treason in the Greek Junta Trials in 1975.

Biography

Early career
Angelis was born in the village of Steni on the island of Euboea in 1912. After completing his studies at the Hellenic Army Academy, he was sworn in as an Artillery Second Lieutenant on 2 August 1934. Promoted to Lieutenant in 1937 and Captain in 1940, he participated in the Greco-Italian War as a mountain artillery battery commander. Following the German invasion and the Axis occupation of Greece, in 1943 Angelis fled the country and joined the Greek Armed Forces in the Middle East, where he commanded an anti-aircraft battery.

After the liberation of Greece he was promoted to Major in 1946, and fought in the Greek Civil War in 1948 and 1949 as an artillery battalion commander. After the end of the civil war, he served in various artillery commands and completed courses at the Superior War School and the National Defence School. He served in the NATO headquarters at Izmir, as aide-de-camp to King Paul, professor at the Superior War School, chief of staff of the 9th Infantry Division, commandant of the Artillery School, Director of the 2nd Staff Bureau at the Hellenic Army General Staff, chief of staff of ASDEN, and deputy commander and commander of the 5th Infantry Division. He was promoted to Lt. Colonel in 1950, Colonel in 1958, Brigadier in 1960, and Major General in 1965.

In 1967 he was promoted to Lt. General and Deputy Chief of the Hellenic National Defence General Staff, a post he held at the time of the coup d'état of 21 April 1967.

Under the Junta
After the establishment of the military regime, he was appointed Chief of the Army General Staff on 22 April 1967. He was responsible, at least officially, for the Army Decree Nr. 13, which banned the musical works of Mikis Theodorakis. On 21 April 1967 Angelis passed a series of laws limiting protest, including a ban on public gatherings of more than five people, a ban on all private gatherings of a political nature, a ban on propaganda against the generals and a ban on civilians holding guns.

During the failed royal counter-coup of 13 December 1967, Angelis remained loyal to the junta, and assumed, in addition to his post as head of the army, the position of Chief of the Hellenic National Defence General Staff. On 19 December 1968, he assumed command of the newly formed Armed Forces Headquarters (Αρχηγείο Ενόπλων Δυνάμεων). He was promoted to full General in 1970, and retired from the army on 16 August 1973.

Personally loyal to junta principal Georgios Papadopoulos, Angelis was chosen by the latter as his Vice President when he abolished the monarchy and declared Greece a Presidential Republic on 1 June 1973. Angelis served in this post until 25 November 1973, when Papadopoulos lost power to a hardliner coup.

Trial and imprisonment
Following the restoration of democratic rule in 1974, in the 1975 Junta Trials, he was sentenced to 20 years imprisonment for high treason and mutiny.  Angelis committed suicide in his cell in the Korydallos Prison on 22 March 1987.

References

Sources
 

1912 births
1987 suicides
20th-century Greek military personnel
Chiefs of the Hellenic Army General Staff
Chiefs of the Hellenic National Defence General Staff
Greek anti-communists
Leaders of the Greek junta
Greek military personnel of the Greek Civil War
Greek military personnel of World War II
Greek military personnel who committed suicide
Greek people who died in prison custody
Hellenic Army generals
Vice presidents of Greece
Suicides in Greece
People who committed suicide in prison custody
People convicted of treason against Greece
Prisoners who died in Greek detention
People from Euboea (regional unit)
1987 deaths